Sacred Heart School, Logrono (Centro Educativo del Sagrado Corazón), La Rioja, Spain, is a school founded by the Society of Jesus in 1957.

Programs 
Sacred Heart Center offers schooling from early childhood and primary education through ESO, baccalaureate, and basic along with PCPI and higher level technical training cycles. The school is implementing the EFQM Excellence Model, and offers the common Administration and Finance program.

It received the silver 'Q' de Plata award in 2007, for excellence in education.

See also
 List of Jesuit sites

References  

Jesuit secondary schools in Spain
Catholic schools in Spain
Educational institutions established in 1957
1957 establishments in Spain